Dzmitry Natynchyk (born 1993) is a Belarusian sprint canoeist.

He won a medal at the 2019 ICF Canoe Sprint World Championships.

References

1993 births
Living people
Belarusian male canoeists
ICF Canoe Sprint World Championships medalists in kayak
Canoeists at the 2019 European Games
European Games competitors for Belarus
Canoeists at the 2020 Summer Olympics
Olympic canoeists of Belarus